William Fitzsimmons (March 4, 1819 – July 1894) was a building contractor and political figure in Ontario, Canada. He represented Brockville and Elizabethtown in the Legislative Assembly of Ontario from 1867 to 1874 and Brockville in the House of Commons of Canada as a Conservative member from 1879 to 1882.

He was born in County Donegal, Ireland in 1819 and came to Perth, Ontario in Upper Canada with his parents in 1823. After completing his schooling, he worked with a building contractor in Perth before settling in Brockville in 1841. He served on the town council, also serving 8 years as mayor, and supervised the building of Victoria Hall. He served in the local militia.

External links 

History of Leeds and Grenville, TWH Leavitt (1879)

1819 births
1894 deaths
Conservative Party of Canada (1867–1942) MPs
Immigrants to Upper Canada
Irish emigrants to pre-Confederation Ontario
Mayors of Brockville
Members of the House of Commons of Canada from Ontario
Progressive Conservative Party of Ontario MPPs